Ron Griffin may refer to:

 Ron Griffin (footballer) (1919–1987), English footballer
 Ron Griffin (artist) (born 1954), American artist